The Scottish Rugby Academy provides Scotland's up and coming rugby stars a dedicated focused routeway for development into the professional game. Entry is restricted to Scottish qualified students and both male and female entrants are accepted into 4 regional academies. The 2018-19 season sees the fourth year of the academy, now sponsored by Fosroc.

Season overview

This was the fourth year of the Scottish Rugby Academy.

Regional Academies

The Scottish Rugby Academy runs four regional academies in Scotland:- Glasgow and the West, Borders and East Lothian, Edinburgh and Caledonia. These roughly correspond to the traditional districts of Glasgow District, South, Edinburgh District and North and Midlands.

Stages

Players are selected in three stages:-

Supported stages

Stage 1 - Regionally selected and regionally supported players
Stage 2 - Nationally selected and regionally supported players

Contracted stage

Stage 3 - Nationally selected and regionally supported players assigned to a professional team.

Academy Players

Stage 3 players

Stage 3 players are assigned to a professional team. Nominally, for the men, Glasgow Warriors receive the Stage 3 players of Glasgow and the West and Caledonia regions, while Edinburgh Rugby receive the Stage 3 players of the Edinburgh and Borders and East Lothian regions. The women are integrated into the Scotland women's national rugby sevens team and the Scotland women's national rugby union team.

This season some of the Stage 3 players were additionally loaned out to Stade Niçois for their development.

A second intake will be announced after the age-grade championships conclude in August.

Borders and East Lothian

Caledonia

Edinburgh

Glasgow and the West

Stade Niçois

Stade Niçois is a French rugby union side. In season 2018-19 they play in the French third tier, in Fédérale 1. They have a partnership agreement with the SRU.

Supported players

The inductees for the 2018-19 season are split into their regional academies.

Borders and East Lothian

 Anna Forsyth (Watsonians)
 Lauren Harris (Melrose Ladies/Edinburgh University)
 Jacob Henry (Melrose)
 Scott King (Preston Lodge)
 Thomas Jeffrey (Jed-Forest)
 Matt Kindness (Kelso)
 Will Owen (Melrose)
 Lana Skeldon (Watsonians)
 Mak Wilson (Melrose).

Caledonia

 Karen Dunbar (Corstorphine Cougars)
 Megan Kennedy (Stirling County)
 Emma Wassell (Murrayfield Wanderers).

Edinburgh

 Sula Callander (Murrayfield Wanderers)
 Jamie Dobie (Merchiston Castle School)
 Dan Gamble (Merchiston Castle School)
 George Goodenough (Boroughmuir)
 Adam Hall (Currie Chieftains)
 Jamie Hodgson (Watsonians)
 Nicola Howatt (Edinburgh University)
 Charlie Jupp (Heriot’s)
 Rachel Law (Edinburgh University)
 Sarah Law (Murrayfield Wanderers)
 Lisa Thomson (DMP Sharks).

Glasgow and the West

 Scott Clelland (Ayr)
 Paddy Dewhirst (Ayr)
 Angus Fraser (Glasgow Hawks)
 Murray Godsman (Glasgow Hawks)
 Grant Hughes (Stirling County)
 Rory Jackson (Kelvinside Academy)
 Andrew Jardine (Melrose)
 Guy Kelly (Biggar)
 Luhann Kotze (Biggar)
 Mairi McDonald (Hillhead Jordanhill)
 Louise McMillan (Hillhead Jordanhill)
 Andrew Nimmo (Glasgow Hawks)
 Kyle Rowe (Ayr)
 Siobhan McMillan (Hillhead Jordanhill)
 Gavin Wilson (Glasgow Hawks)
 Dan York (Glasgow Hawks).

Graduates of this year 

Players who have signed professional contracts with clubs:

  Grant Stewart to  Glasgow Warriors
  Stafford McDowall to  Glasgow Warriors
  Jamie Dobie to  Glasgow Warriors
  Thomas Gordon to  Glasgow Warriors
  Jack Blain  to  Edinburgh Rugby
  Kyle Rowe to  Scotland 7s
  Robbie Smith to  Bedford Blues
  George Spencer to  Jersey Reds

References

2018-19
2018–19 in Scottish rugby union